Nesiostrymon is a Neotropical genus of butterflies in the family Lycaenidae. It was first described by Harry Kendon Clench in 1964.

Species
Nesiostrymon calchinia (Hewitson, 1868)
Nesiostrymon hyccara (Hewitson, 1868)
Nesiostrymon celida (Lucas, 1857)
Nesiostrymon shoumatoffi (Comstock & Huntington, 1943)
Nesiostrymon celona (Hewitson, 1874)
Nesiostrymon dodava (Hewitson, 1877)
Nesiostrymon endela (Hewitson, 1874)
Nesiostrymon tristis (Lathy, 1926)

References

Eumaeini
Lycaenidae of South America
Lycaenidae genera